The 1896 New Hampshire football team was an American football team that represented New Hampshire College of Agriculture and the Mechanic Arts during the 1896 college football season—the school became the University of New Hampshire in 1923. The team played a five-game schedule and finished with a record of 2–3 or 1–4, per 1896 sources or modern sources, respectively.

Schedule
Scoring during this era awarded 4 points for a touchdown, 2 points for a conversion kick (extra point), and 5 points for a field goal. Teams played in the one-platoon system and the forward pass was not yet legal. Games were played in two halves rather than four quarters.

College Football Data Warehouse and the University's media guide do not list the game against Brewster Academy, but do list the game against Somersworth. The New Hampshire College Monthly provides a summary of the Brewster Academy game, and refers to the Bates contest as the "second game this season". The College Monthly notes that the Somersworth game was contested by New Hampshire's second team (backups) rather than the varsity.

The October 14 game was the first meeting between the New Hampshire and Colby football programs.

Maine State College (now the University of Maine) released a football schedule in September that listed a game against New Hampshire to be played on November 7. However, that game was not played, and the first Maine–New Hampshire game would not occur until 1903.

Roster

Source:

Notes

References

New Hampshire
New Hampshire Wildcats football seasons
New Hampshire football